The "Golden Chain" is a list of names that was seized in March 2002 in a raid by Bosnian police of the premises of the Benevolence International Foundation in Sarajevo. The Golden Chain is a list of sponsors of Al-Qaeda.

The list included twenty-five names, twenty of them very wealthy Saudis and Gulf States financial sponsors including bankers, businessmen, and former ministers. Part of the list includes a computer file titled "Tarekh Osama" or "Osama History", but the appellation "Golden Chain" itself is due to al Qaeda defector Jamal al-Fadl, who vouched for its authenticity. The computer file contained photographs of the birth and early days of al-Qaeda as well as letters and documents, some in bin Laden's handwriting. In the seized material, records were found of both the plans for al-Qaeda's activities and its organizational structure and operational foundations.  These are believed to have been prepared by bin Laden and his mentor Sheikh Abdallah Azzam.

They also found a list of 20 Arab plutocrats, the “Golden Chain”, who were suspected of financing international terrorism, including al-Qaeda. The custody of the secret and confidential material was entrusted to bin Laden's confidant Enaam Arnaout, who was convinced that the documents were in the safest and most secure place in the Sarajevo office of the Benevolence International Foundation. During a search of the Benevolence International Foundation's offices in Sarajevo, the relevant law enforcement agencies found clear evidence of a connection between the head of the office, Enaam Arnaout, and Osama bin Laden, and of “militant” subordination between the two, and charges were brought against Arnaout.

Most accounts are vague on what year the Golden Chain document was written; some say 1988 but U.S. counter-terrorism advisor Richard A. Clarke says it dates from 1989. The "Golden Chain" was presented by the U.S. government in the criminal case United States v. Arnaout filed on January 29, 2003, and in other legal filings.

The American government has never publicly released the full document, and so the full list of names is a matter of conjecture and speculation. In 2003, the Wall Street Journal reported that it included "billionaire bankers Saleh Kamel and Khalid bin Mahfouz, as well as the Al-Rajhi family, another banking family, and Mr. bin Laden's own brothers." Minutes of the Sarajevo meeting on 11 August 1988 confirmed that bin Laden had begun his jihadist movement at that time. Bin Laden decided to recruit members and raise funds from Saudi Arabia. To carry out his jihadist war, he had to enlist the wealthy plutocrats of the Gulf, the “Golden Chain”, to fund al-Qaeda. The “Golden Chain” was a copy of a handwritten 1988 draft listing the wealthy financiers of the mujahedin's operations in Afghanistan, known within al-Qaeda as the “Golden Chain”. At the top of the document, translated from Arabic by the US Department of Justice, was a quote from the Koran: 'And spend in the cause of God'.

References

External links
 Excerpt: The Osama bin Laden I know
 L'investigateur - tous droits rèservès
 Sophistpundit - The Golden Chain
 Context of '1988: ’Al-Qaeda’ Possibly the Name of a Computer Database at Cooperative Research
 Der Spiegel, "Osama's Road to Riches and Terror"

Al-Qaeda